Foldereid is a village in Nærøysund municipality in Trøndelag county, Norway. The Norwegian County Road 770 and the Norwegian County Road 17 both run through the village and the Folda Bridge (over the Foldafjord) lies just east of the village. Foldereid Church is located in the village.

The village was the administrative centre of the old municipality of Foldereid that existed from 1886 until 1964.

References

External links
http://www.foldereid.no

Villages in Trøndelag
Nærøysund